Hohner Harde is an Amt ("collective municipality") in the district of Rendsburg-Eckernförde, in Schleswig-Holstein, Germany. It is situated approximately 10 km west of Rendsburg. The seat of the Amt is in Hohn.

The Amt Hohner Harde consists of the following municipalities:

Bargstall 
Breiholz 
Christiansholm 
Elsdorf-Westermühlen 
Friedrichsgraben
Friedrichsholm
Hamdorf 
Hohn
Königshügel 
Lohe-Föhrden 
Prinzenmoor 
Sophienhamm

Ämter in Schleswig-Holstein